Beylik of Tacettin (Tacettinoğulları, Tacettinids) was a small Turkmen principality in Anatolia in the 14th and 15th centuries.

Tacettin
After Seljuks of Anatolia were defeated by the Mongols in 1243, many small beylik (principalities) emerged in Anatolia. Tacettin of Canik founded his small beylik in and around Niksar, mid north Anatolia in 1348. His small beylik was one of the small beyliks which were collectively known as Beyliks of Canik.  In 1378 he married Eudokia of Trebizond, the daughter of the Alexios III of Trebizond, the emperor of Trebizond. In 1386 he fell in the battle during his campaign to Hacıemir controlled Ordu (ancient  Cotyora).

Mahmut
The next bey was Mahmut. During the early years of Mahmut's  reign, the beylik was between two great powers: namely the Ottoman Empire to the south west and Kadı Buhanettin to the south. Although Mahmut accepted Burhanettin's suzerainty he secretly encouraged Bayezit I of the Ottomans against Burhanettin. But the blow came from his brother Alparslan. Alparsalan revolted and captured most of his territory. Nevertheless, after Alparslan's and Burhanettin's death in 1398 he accepted the suzerainty of the Ottoman.

After Timur
In 1402 Turkic warlord Timur invaded Anatolia and defeated Bayezit in the battle of Ankara. During the chaos following the battle (Ottoman Interregnum), Mahmut Bey continued as an ally of the Ottomans. However, during the revolt of Küçük Mustafa (the brother of Murat II), he supported Küçük Mustafa and killed Mihaloğlu Mehmet a descendant of Köse Mihal and a partisan of Murat II in 1423. But after the battle, he was killed by his own soldiers . He had two sons;  Hüsamettin Hasan and Hüsamettin Mehmet Yavuz. Although the brothers tried to continue in Samsun and Çarşamba, their beylik soon ceased to exist in about 1428.

References

History of Tokat Province
Anatolian beyliks
States and territories established in 1348
States and territories disestablished in 1428
History of Samsun Province
Chepni people